Struggling Hearts (Hungarian: Vergödö szívek) is a 1916 Hungarian drama film directed by Alexander Korda and starring Lili Berky, Gyula Gál and Alajos Mészáros.

Cast
Lili Berky   
Gyula Gál   
Alajos Mészáros   
Flora Fay   
Márton Garas   
Gyula Kozma   
Aranka Laczkó   
Andor Szakács

References

External links

1916 films
Hungarian silent films
Hungarian drama films
Films directed by Alexander Korda
Hungarian black-and-white films
Austro-Hungarian films
1916 drama films
Silent drama films